John Armstrong  (1792–1856) was a 19th-century Anglican priest in Ireland.

Armstrong was born in King's County (now Offaly), educated at Trinity College, Dublin and became Dean of Kilfenora in 1847.

References

Deans of Kilfenora
Alumni of Trinity College Dublin
1792 births
1856 deaths
People from County Offaly